Turkey competed at the 1952 Summer Olympics in Helsinki, Finland.

Medalists

Results by event

Basketball

Men's Team Competition

Qualification Round (Group C)
 Lost to Egypt (52-64)
 Lost to Italy (37-49) → did not advance, 22nd place

Wrestling

References
Official Olympic Reports
International Olympic Committee results database

Nations at the 1952 Summer Olympics
1952
1952 in Turkish sport